The Other Boleyn Girl is a 2003 BBC television film directed and written by Philippa Lowthorpe, adapted from Philippa Gregory's 2001 novel of the same name. It centres around courtier Mary Boleyn and her sister Anne Boleyn, second wife of Henry VIII, King of England, and their competition for his affections.

It was released on DVD on 6 October 2008, following the release of the 2008 version.

Plot
The film follows the story of Mary Boleyn (Natascha McElhone), sister to Anne and George Boleyn. Henry VIII (Jared Harris) favours Mary, recently married to William Carey, and lady-in-waiting to his wife, Catherine of Aragon. Despite her objections, Mary is forced by her ambitious family to become the King's mistress. Although Mary at first despairs that her husband has consented to the arrangement, and feels guilty whenever she serves the Queen, she begins to come to terms with her fate.

Mary's sister, Anne falls in love with Lord Henry Percy and, despite Mary's warnings, they consummate the affair. Mary informs their family, who tell Anne that she has made a grave mistake. Percy is already betrothed, and the match was arranged with royal consent. Fearing the matter will spoil Mary's relationship with the King, the family plan to send Anne away. An enraged Anne says she will never forget what Mary has done, and is exiled to the family seat of Hever Castle.

Mary falls in love with the King, and begins to enjoy their time together; she does not feel remorse over Anne, feeling she has saved her from ruin. Anne, at Hever, declares she will never fall in love again, and plots revenge and her return to court. Mary becomes estranged from her husband.

A year passes, and Mary becomes pregnant with the King's child. Anne is permitted back at court, dutifully announcing she is grateful and will serve her family any way she can, although Mary is skeptical of her sincerity. The family plans for Anne to distract and amuse the King as Mary enters her confinement; but the King finds Anne to be more than a distraction, informing her that he finds her more attractive than Mary. Learning from her sister's example, Anne however refuses to go to bed with him, hoping to encourage and strengthen his desire for her.

Mary gives birth to a son, but the King now cares only for Anne. A devastated Mary leaves court, while Anne takes her place as the King's new love. Mary reconciles with husband William, and they have a daughter; two years later, he dies from the sweating sickness. Anne is given new chambers and expensive gowns, and tells Mary that she needs her by her side at all times, so that she is protected from scandal. The true extent of Anne's ambition is revealed: as the King's marriage has produced no heir, and she could potentially provide him with one, he will have little choice but to make her his new queen. Mary, shocked, reminds Anne of Henry Percy, and Anne replies that he was nothing to her, and that Mary is a traitor if she ever reveals the relationship.

Anne's game pays off as the King soon initiates divorce proceedings against Catherine. But just as they are about to be finalized, he hears that Percy's wife is asking for an anullment, on the basis that there was a precontract between Anne and Percy and informs Anne that they cannot be together if that was the case. Suddenly faced with possible ruin, Anne pressures Mary to testify on her behalf that there was no betrothal. The King makes Anne swear to him that she has never loved any other man, and she decides that she must now fulfill her own promise to him. That night, Anne and the King finally make love, and her triumph is soon complete as he finally marries her and crowns her queen. Shortly afterwards, she is confirmed to be pregnant.

While Anne prepares for having her child, Mary sneaks away from court to see William Stafford, a former servant of the Boleyns, and accepts his marriage proposal. Anne banishes Mary from court, telling her that such a lowly match has shamed the family. The King is disappointed when Anne gives birth to a daughter, Elizabeth, and her hold on him begins to slip away.

Anne makes a jealous scene in public and an angry Henry drives Anne to depart the room. Her uncle follows; when Anne demands respect her uncle informs her that she now has many enemies and leaves, Anne yelling after him. While visiting Wulfhall in Wiltshire, the King spends time with the daughter of the family, Jane Seymour, and greatly enjoys her company.

Anne has two miscarriages and seems unlikely to bear a son. Upon finding a pamphlet depicting her decapitation, a panicked Anne summons George and Mary, telling them the court wants her dead. Mary asks Anne when she last had sex with the King, and suggests she might have more success with a different man, implying that George and Anne should sleep together. George is horrified but when Anne begs on her knees for her brother to save her, he reluctantly consents.

Anne reveals her pregnancy to a delighted King, but when she again miscarries, her days are numbered. George and several other men are taken to the Tower on charges of treason and adultery; Anne is next. In a final audience with the King, she reminds him that he once loved her, and asks if he will take her away from their daughter. Proclaiming her innocence, she asks God to have mercy on his soul, and bidding farewell to Elizabeth, sings her a song as she is led away.

Mary narrates that George, Anne and the men were all beheaded. She has left court with her children, and is happy with William Stafford.

Cast
 Natascha McElhone as Mary Boleyn
 Jodhi May as Anne Boleyn
 Jared Harris as Henry VIII
 Steven Mackintosh as George Boleyn
 Philip Glenister as William Stafford
 Jack Shepherd as Thomas Boleyn
 Ron Cook as Thomas Cromwell, 1st Earl of Essex
 Anthony Howell as William Carey
 Jane Gurnett as Elizabeth Boleyn
 Yolanda Vazquez as Catherine of Aragon
 Geoffrey Streatfeild as Francis Weston

Production
The film had a low production budget of £750,000. It was shot at Berkeley Castle in Gloucestershire, adopting techniques unusual for an historical drama. Some scenes are shot in a confessional straight-to-camera "video diary" style, and hand-held cameras are used.

The cast spent four weeks in workshops improvising the script with the director.

Critical reception
The camera work proved to be somewhat divisive for critics. The Guardians Stuart Jeffries wrote that while some previewers thought it had "the feel of Peter Greenaway-lite", he found it interfered with the story, described as "a gripping, well-written narrative" and likened it to "NYPD Blue Visits Hampton Court".

Differences from book

In the book, Mary is the younger sister (born in 1508) and Anne is the elder sister (born in 1507). In the film, Mary clearly states that Anne is her younger sister.
In the book, William Carey is not consulted about Mary's forthcoming involvement with the King, and instead comes to find their bedchambers being torn apart so that Mary can move into a separate bedchamber with Anne. Mary protests this, out of loyalty to her husband and to Queen Katherine, but her complaints fall on deaf ears. In the film, William Carey is seen participating in the meetings and consenting to Mary's being the King's mistress. 
In the book, a soothsayer tells King Henry that if he sleeps with Queen Katherine, then he will get a son. This breaks Mary's heart, as she had already begun her affair with the King; she stays up late with her husband and with her brother, George, and kisses her husband goodnight. This does not happen in the film.
In the book, Mary and George are in on Anne's betrothal to Henry Percy of Northumberland, and leave them alone to consummate their union. In the film, Mary catches Anne sleeping with Henry Percy, and promptly tells her mother, father, and uncle about it. In both the book and the film, Henry Percy is sent back to Northumberland and married against his will, while Anne is sent to Hever Castle.
In the book, Mary's first child is Catherine, and is born in 1524, and the King seems to understand that Catherine is his, and even suggests the name Elizabeth before Mary asks to name her something else. In the film, Catherine is portrayed as William Carey's daughter, and born between 1526 and 1528.
In the book, Mary's second child is a boy, Henry, born in March 1526 (as he was factually). In the film, Henry is the only child born during her affair with King Henry, and the King has already begun a flirtation with Anne, and shows no interest in the boy, much like the book.
In the film, William Carey comes to Mary's rooms during her affair with the King, and asks her to spend the night with him. Mary says she can't because she is the King's mistress, and William asks her to set a date for them to be together; Mary, evasive, says that she must stay with the King, and William leaves, embittered and feeling betrayed. This does not happen in the book.
In the book, William Carey dies of the sweating sickness in 1528, at his own manor in Norfolk, while Mary goes to Hever to be with her children, and Anne and George come as well, as Anne is ill; it is also hinted that Mary and William fell in love prior to his death, due to their spending so much time together. In the film, William Carey seems to die at court, and Mary doesn't seem to care that he dies.
In the book, Anne sleeps with Henry for the first time after he makes her Marquess of Pembroke, in September 1532, before they go to France. In the film, Anne sleeps with Henry after her affair with Henry Percy comes to light. The latter happened in the book, but under different circumstances.
In the book, Anne and Henry take the court to France so that the French King can support their union, and Mary and William Stafford continue their affair. In the film, they don't go to France.
In the book, Mary goes to Hever Castle every summer to spend time with their children, and sometimes William Stafford joins them. In the film, they only go once, yet William Stafford is shown to have a rapport with her children.
In the book, William Stafford claims that he is courting Mary and that he is in love with her, and while Mary does not verbally reciprocate, she seems pleased. In the film, William Stafford awkwardly and suddenly proposes to Mary, and she is angered that he doesn't merely want to be friends, and runs off.
In the book, there is a casual mention of Mary's engagement to a French prince after Anne marries King Henry. In the film, after Anne's marriage to the King, Anne suggests elderly men with wealth and titles to marry Mary, including a Lord Farmleigh.
In the book, Mary doesn't tell Anne that she married William Stafford for over a year. In the film, she tells her entire family (minus George) that she has married William Stafford. In both the film and the movie, she is banished; while in the book, it is in 1534 for a year, and in the film, it is 1534 for two years.
In the book, Henry seems slightly pleased with Princess Elizabeth and seems hopeful about future children with Anne. In the film, Henry immediately takes a mistress, devastating Anne.
In the book, Mary has a child with William Stafford—a daughter named Anne. In the film, Mary has only two children—Henry and Catherine.
In the book, when Mary returns to court, Anne is pregnant. In the film, when she is returned to court late in the night, Anne is not pregnant.
In the book, after Elizabeth's birth, Anne has a total of three miscarriages. In the film, Anne goes through a period of inability to conceive and doesn't know what to do.
In the book, Mary discovers through watching and listening to Anne and George's mannerisms that they have had sex in order for Anne to get pregnant, because the King had become disgusted with her failure. In the film, it is Mary who casually suggests the coupling, but doesn't say it, merely hinting at it, so as she will not be implicated later.
In the book, Anne's official musician is Mark Smeaton, who is later tortured and executed for an affair with her. In the film, she has Mark Smeaton sing to her before the court; when Mark is arrested, Anne claims to "hardly know him".
In the book, Anne is arrested during a joust in the spring of 1536 and doesn't have a final moment with the King. In the film, Anne is arrested at court after speaking to the King, protesting her innocence, and saying goodbye to Elizabeth.
In the book, Mary's daughter Catherine is 12 years old and at court with her, and is taken by Anne as a lady-in-waiting to the Tower of London. Because of this, William Stafford keeps her son Henry and their daughter Anne at inns in London, and they remain there for the execution. In the film, Mary merely takes her children from Hever Castle and to William Stafford's house, as they are only ten and eight respectively.

References

External links
 

2003 television films
2003 films
British television films
BBC television royalty dramas
Television set in Tudor England
Films about Henry VIII
BBC television docudramas
Cultural depictions of Anne Boleyn
Mary Boleyn
Cultural depictions of Catherine of Aragon
Biographical films about English royalty
Films set in the 16th century
Films based on British novels
Films about sisters
2000s British films